Raja Krishnamoorthy, popularly known as Kitty is an Indian director, screenwriter and actor, primarily working in the Tamil film industry with a few films in Telugu, Malayalam, and Hindi cinema. He has directed films like Dasarathan (1993). He made his acting debut in Mani Ratnam' s Nayakan, released in 1987.

Early life
He has done his Masters in Management Studies from Jamnalal Bajaj Institute of Management Studies, Mumbai, 1975. He started with Mukund Iron & Steel as Management Trainee and Personnel Officer; he was with ITC Welcome Group as Personnel Manager and Regional Personnel Manager, and subsequently, with Enfield India Limited as General Manager (Human Resources). Between June 2000 and March 2002, he worked actively with Polaris Software Lab Ltd., an organization of 2600 people, as consultant and President of Human Resources. From July 2002 till August 2005, he was leading the Consulting and training Division, as Principal Consultant - at ProLease India Pvt. Ltd., part of the Washington DC based Interpro Group. Currently, he heads the Consulting and Training Division and directs the HRD function at talent Maximus. Kitty was at one point the manager at Chola Sheraton, and was therefore known as "Chola" Krishnamurthy. He briefly worked as General Manager at Enfield which he quit to pursue acting as a career.

Actor
Kitty is known for his impressive performances in Kamal Haasan' s Soora Samhaaram (1988) and Sathya (1988), Rajinikanth' s Baashha (1995) and Mani Ratnam' s Bombay (1995).

Other works
Apart from acting, he is the director HRD of Talent Maximus India Ltd. He wrote a book called Rajini Punchtantra: Business and Life management. He has contested in 2016 Tamil Nadu Legislative Assembly election in Velachery constituency as an Independent candidate and lost the election.

Filmography

As actor

Films

Television

As director

As dubbing artist

References

General

External links
 

Tamil film directors
Male actors in Tamil cinema
Tamil male actors
Tamil screenwriters
Living people
Jamnalal Bajaj Institute of Management Studies alumni
Male actors from Mumbai
20th-century Indian film directors
20th-century Indian male actors
21st-century Indian male actors
Male actors in Telugu cinema
Indian male film actors
Male actors in Hindi cinema
Film directors from Mumbai
Screenwriters from Tamil Nadu
1952 births